The enzyme carboxylesterase (or carboxylic-ester hydrolase, EC 3.1.1.1; systematic name carboxylic-ester hydrolase) catalyzes reactions of the following form:

a carboxylic ester + H2O  an alcohol + a carboxylate

Most enzymes from this group are serine hydrolases belonging to the superfamily of proteins with α/β hydrolase fold. Some exceptions include an esterase with β-lactamase-like structure.

Carboxylesterases are widely distributed in nature, and are common in mammalian liver. Many participate in phase I metabolism of xenobiotics such as toxins or drugs; the resulting carboxylates are then conjugated by other enzymes to increase solubility and eventually excreted. The essential polyunsaturated fatty acid arachidonic acid (AA C20H32O2; 20:4, n-6), formed by the synthesis from dietary linoleic acid (LA: C18H32O2 18:2, n-6), has a role as a human carboxylesterase inhibitor.

The carboxylesterase family of evolutionarily related proteins (those with clear sequence homology to each other) includes a number of proteins with different substrate specificities, such as acetylcholinesterases.

Examples 

 acetylcholinesterase
 ali-esterase,
 B-esterase,
 butyrate esterase,
 butyryl esterase,
carboxylesterase 1
carboxylesterase 2
carboxylesterase 3
 esterase A,
 esterase B,
 esterase D,
 methylbutyrase,
 methylbutyrate esterase,
 monobutyrase,
 procaine esterase,
 propionyl esterase,
 triacetin esterase,
 vitamin A esterase, and
 cocaine esterase

The last enzyme also participates in alkaloid biosynthesis.

Genes 

Humans genes that encode carboxylesterase enzymes include:
 CES1
 CES2
 CES3
 CES4
 CES7
 CES8

An approved nomenclature has been established for the five mammalian carboxylesterase gene families.

References

Further reading 

 
 
 
 
 
 
 
 

EC 3.1.1